Shmagi Bolkvadze (born July 26, 1994) is a Greco-Roman wrestler from Georgia. In 2016 he won bronze medals at the European championships and Rio Olympics.

References

External links
 

1994 births
Living people
People from Khulo
Male sport wrestlers from Georgia (country)
Olympic wrestlers of Georgia (country)
Wrestlers at the 2016 Summer Olympics
Medalists at the 2016 Summer Olympics
Olympic bronze medalists for Georgia (country)
Olympic medalists in wrestling
Wrestlers at the 2019 European Games
European Games medalists in wrestling
European Games silver medalists for Georgia (country)
European Wrestling Championships medalists
European Wrestling Champions
21st-century people from Georgia (country)